Catonella is a Gram-negative, obligately anaerobic, non-spore-forming and non-motile bacterial genus from the family of Lachnospiraceae with one known species (Catonella morbi). Catonella morbi occur in the gingival crevice of humans.

References

 

Lachnospiraceae
Monotypic bacteria genera
Bacteria genera